Rostrevor College is an independent Catholic primary and secondary day and boarding school for boys, located in Woodforde, a suburb of Adelaide, South Australia, approximately  from the Adelaide city centre.

The school was established in 1923 by the Christian Brothers. Its founder and first headmaster was Br David Purton. The school currently enrols approximately 850 local and international students from Reception to year 12, including 90 boarders in Years 8 to 12. The students are divided into Junior (R-6), Middle (7–9) and Senior (10–12) Years, who together share a  campus situated in the Morialta foothills.

Rostrevor College is a member of the Association of Heads of Independent Schools of Australia (AHISA), the Australian Boarding Schools' Association, the Junior School Heads Association of Australia (JSHAA), and the Independent Schools Sport Association (ISSA).

History

1923–1970s
Rostrevor College originated as an extension of Christian Brothers College, Adelaide (CBC Adelaide) which had, by 1922, outgrown its ability to house its boarding students on the Wakefield Street campus. In December 1922, the Christian Brothers purchased the Rostrevor Estate in Magill for a sum equivalent to $20,500. The previous owner of Rostrevor has been a nurseryman and as such, the original grounds incorporated extensive and well-kept gardens and orchards of oranges, lemons and stone fruits, as well as Rostrevor House, a coach house, caretakers' residence, stables, and a large lake providing on-site water supply.

Rostrevor is a village near Newry, now in Northern Ireland, where Ross Thompson Reid was raised. Reid arrived in South Australia in 1839, at the age of six. He accumulated wealth and built a magnificent mansion which he named Rostrevor Hall. Although the school is situated along the boundary of the suburb of Woodforde, the adjacent suburb of Rostrevor was named in honour of the original grounds on which the school is sited. Rostrevor Hall, now widely known as Rostrevor House, was constructed in two stages with the southern two-storey side completed in 1878, and the arches and northern side added in 1901.

The main residence, Rostrevor House, was the original accommodation provided to the boarders, the Christian Brothers, and some of the classes. From the time of taking possession in February 1923, a large new chapel, five classrooms and a chemistry laboratory were built before the college could be opened. By the end of the first term these facilities were ready and so after the May holidays, classes commenced at Rostrevor College on 29 May 1923. Brother Purton was appointed Headmaster of the new college and he, along with three other Brothers, namely McMahon, O'Sullivan and Dean (the last would be replaced later that year by Br Coghlan), all of the boarders and all students in the Intermediate, Leaving and Leaving Honours classes transferred to Rostrevor. Some day scholars joined the junior grades and, from the beginning, there were classes from the very junior grades to Leaving Honours at Rostrevor. For many years after 1923, students from CBC Adelaide transferred to Rostrevor after Intermediate to study from Leaving and Leaving Honours, thus maintaining a close link between the two colleges; in fact, sports teams were drawn from both until the early 1940s, when Leaving and Leaving Honours classes were re-established at CBC Adelaide.. From then on the two colleges became separate and competing establishments.

By the end of 1923, Rostrevor was well established as a school. Throughout the year more facilities, including the bungalow for more accommodation for the boarders and extra classrooms, had been built and Rostrevor was able to settle down to a period of consolidation.

Dan Clifford (1887–1942), owner of D. Clifford Theatres, a cinema chain, was a generous benefactor of the school. Among other things, he commissioned and donated the first ever Rostrevor flag, as well as donating the school's first movie projector. His son, Dan Jnr, who attended the school from 1944, after his father's death.

The bungalow, which used to exist alongside what is now the Junior School oval, to which it has lent its name ('The Bungalow'), was demolished in 1960. Further developments included the construction of the Rice Wing in 1961, named in honour of the founder of the Christian Brothers, Edmund Ignatius Rice. The Purton Auditorium was completed in 1970, the Mogg wing in the mid-1970s and the J.V. Bourke swimming pool in the late 1970s.

1980s to now
During 1983, Rostrevor celebrated its Diamond Jubilee. The major project for these celebrations was the substantial renovation to the College Chapel. This saw the restoration of the building itself, beautification of its immediate surroundings, redecoration of the interior, new seating at the front of the chapel and a new pipe organ.

During the Jubilee Year, attempts were made to negotiate the retention of the Boarding School. Unfortunately, these efforts were not successful, and so the last group of boarders left at the end of 1983, thus temporarily ending an era in the history of Rostrevor and of the Catholic Church in South Australia. By the mid-1980s, enrolments increased to over 900 and formal management structures were established, with the appointment of Heads of Department responsible for Curriculum Development and the introduction of new Pastoral Care Arrangements. In 1987 the Rostrevor College Board was established, with Justice Kevin Duggan as first chairman. To ensure a sound financial base for future development, the Rostrevor Foundation was also established, with Creagh O'Connor as the first chairman.

The South Australian Commission for Catholic Schools set up a Task Force to examine the needs of Catholic Boarding Schools in South Australia, and asked Rostrevor to again admit boarders. This was agreed to, thus reversing the decision taken some ten years earlier.

Recent improvements to the school, include the construction in 2006 of the new 'Technology and ICT Discovery Centre', with displays of robotics and pneumatics, design and computing.  The former 'Technology Centre' was upgraded at the same time, to now be the 'Skills Centre' includes the new Environmental Education Centre and Vocational Counselling facilities. 29 May 2018 marked the 95th anniversary of the college since 1923 classes officially commenced at Rostrevor College. Port Adelaide defender Jack Hombsch joined the celebration. The boys marked a 95 on one of the ovals while a high-tech drone hovered above the spectacular College grounds.

Coat of arms

The Rostrevor coat of arms, is an adaptation of the first coat of arms of the Congregation of Christian Brothers. The present version has been the Rostrevor College coat of arms since its foundation except for the motto which was changed from "Signum Fidei" ("Sign of Faith") to "Palma Merenti" ("The reward to the one who earns it") in 1948.

The large red star signifies the virtue of Faith and the Cross above it symbolises Christ and the Christian Faith. The laurels (palms) of the crest are symbolic of practices from ancient times, in which early Christians who as martyrs gave their lives in fidelity to Christ and thus earned the 'palms of martyrdom', as well as being customary in ancient times to present a wreath of palms as a reward or an acknowledgement of effort and achievement.

List of headmasters 
Brother D.G. Purton (1923)
Brother J.F. O'Brien (1924–1926)
Brother M.P. Dwyer (1927)
Brother D.O. Joyce (1928–1933)
Brother I.L. Mackey (1933–1938)
Brother J.E. McElligott (1939–1941)
Brother P.L. Duffy (1942)
Brother C.A. Mogg (1943–1945, 1950–1955)
Brother S.L. Carroll (1946–1947)
Brother B.G. Rooney (1948–1949)
Brother J.L. Kelty (1956–1961)
Brother J.N. O'Sullivan (1962–1967)
Brother R.M. Morphett (1968–1970)
Brother W.G. Hall (1971–1973)
Brother J.V. Bourke (1974–1976)
Brother J.P. Marks (1977–1984)
Brother K.C. McMaster (1984–1987)
Brother T.X. Hann (1988 – June 1992)
Brother P.D. McGlaughlin (July 1992 – July 2002)
Mr J Croser (2003–2010)
Mr S Dash (2011–2016)
Mr D Messer (2017)
Mr B Schumacher (2018-2020)
Mr F Ranaldo (Present)

Curriculum
Rostrevor College offers education in the nationally recognised South Australian Certificate of Education (SACE). The curriculum includes a choice of more than 25 subjects in Year 12, and the option to study vocational courses from Year 10.

Notable alumni

John Aloisi, former Socceroo, FIFA World Cup player
Ross Aloisi, former Socceroo and Adelaide United captain
Paul Blackwell, actor
Tim Cook, former Adelaide Crows and Central District footballer
Paul Cronin, actor, television series Matlock Police and The Sullivans
Jared Crouch, former Sydney Swans footballer
Luke Darcy, former Western Bulldogs footballer and media personality
Daniel Falzon, five-time Australian Motorcycle Racing champion
Darcy Fogarty, Adelaide Crows footballer
Patrick Frost, actor 
Daniel Harris, former South Australian state cricketer
Ben Hart, former Adelaide footballer and assistant coach
Jack Hombsch, former Port Adelaide footballer and current Gold Coast footballer
Paul Izzo, Adelaide United soccer player
Ben Jarvis (footballer)
Tom Jonas, Port Adelaide footballer
Bruce Kamau, former Adelaide United and current Melbourne City soccer player
Paul Kelly, musician
Neil Kerley, SANFL Football Legend, AFL Hall of Fame and media personality
Anthony LaPaglia, actor
Jonathan LaPaglia, physician and actor
Peter Marker, former Glenelg and SA football captain, sports presenter
John Noble, actor and theatre director
Harry Petty, Melbourne Demons footballer
Elkin Reilly, South Melbourne footballer
Xavier Samuel, actor
Daniel Schell, former Adelaide Crows and Central District footballer
Henry Slattery, former Essendon Bombers footballer
Luke Surman, Hawthorn Hawks footballer
Murali K. Thalluri, film director, writer, and producer
Luke Valente, AFL Footballer
Peter Vivian, former Norwood FC captain and SA football player
Callum Wilkie, AFL Footballer
Mark Leonard Winter, actor

House system
As with most Australian schools, Rostrevor College utilises a house system, through which students participate in intra-school competitions and activities.

See also

 Catholic Church in Australia
 List of schools in South Australia
 List of boarding schools

References

External links
 Rostevor College website

Congregation of Christian Brothers secondary schools in Australia
Catholic secondary schools in Adelaide
Educational institutions established in 1923
Boys' schools in South Australia
Catholic primary schools in Adelaide
Catholic boarding schools in Australia
Junior School Heads Association of Australia Member Schools
Boarding schools in South Australia
Congregation of Christian Brothers primary schools in Australia
1923 establishments in Australia